Méautis is a commune in the Manche department in Normandy in northwestern France.

World War II
After the liberation of the area by Allied Forces in 1944, engineers of the Ninth Air Force IX Engineering Command began construction of a combat Advanced Landing Ground outside of the town.  Declared operational on 17 August, the airfield was designated as "A-17", it was used by the 50th Fighter Group which flew P-47 Thunderbolts until early September when the unit moved into Central France.  Afterward, the airfield was closed.

See also
Communes of the Manche department

References

Communes of Manche